Ligidia is a monotypic moth genus of the family Noctuidae. Its only species, Ligidia decisissima, is found in Borneo. Both the genus and species were first described by Francis Walker in 1862.

References

External links
Original description: 

Acontiinae
Monotypic moth genera